The Rough Guide to Native American Music is a compilation album originally released in 1998. Part of the World Music Network Rough Guides series, the album features both traditional and modern Native American music ranging from canción ranchera to hardcore rap. Catherine Steinmann coordinated the project, Andrew Means wrote the liner notes, and Phil Stanton, co-founder of the World Music Network, produced and compiled the album. 2012's The Rough Guide to Native America is sometimes considered a second edition to this release.

Critical reception

Alex Henderson of AllMusic praised the variety of the album, saying that while it's not the "last word" on Native American music, it is nonetheless "interesting" and "exciting". He considered Without Rezervation's call for an uprising on Track Ten especially compelling.

Track listing

References

External links 
 

1998 compilation albums
World Music Network Rough Guide albums